The MLS Best XI is an annual acknowledgment of the best eleven players in Major League Soccer.

Winners
Players in bold were awarded the Landon Donovan MVP Award for that season.

Most appearances by a player
The following players have appeared in the MLS Best XI four or more times.

Appearances by team

See also
MLS All-Time Best XI

References

Best XI